Demochares (c. 355275 BC), nephew of Demosthenes, Athenian orator and statesman, was one of the few distinguished Athenians in the period of decline.

Biography
Demochares is first heard of in 322, when he spoke in vain against the surrender of Demosthenes and the other anti-Macedonian orators demanded by Antipater. During the next fifteen years he probably lived in exile. On the restoration of the democracy by Demetrius Poliorcetes in 307 he occupied a prominent position, but was banished in 303 for having ridiculed the decree of Stratocles, which contained a fulsome eulogy of Demetrius.

Demochares was recalled in 298, and during the next four years he fortified and equipped the city with provisions and ammunition. In 296 (or 295) he was again banished for having concluded an alliance with the Boeotians, and did not return until 287 (or 286). In 280 he induced the Athenians to erect a public monument in honour of his uncle with a suitable inscription. After his death (some five years later) the son of Demochares proposed and obtained a decree  that a statue should be erected in his honour, containing a record of his public services, which seem to have consisted in a reduction of public expenses, a more prudent management of the state finances (after his return in 287) and successful begging missions to the rulers of Egypt and Macedon.

Although a friend of the Stoic Zeno, Demochares regarded all other philosophers as the enemies of freedom, and in 306 supported the proposal of one Sophocles, advocating their expulsion from Attica. According to Cicero Demochares was the author of a history of his own times, written in an oratorical rather than a historical style. As a speaker he was noted for his freedom of language (Parrhesiastes ). He was violently attacked by Timaeus, but found a strenuous defender in Polybius. See also Plutarch, Demosthenes, Demetrius, Vitae decem oratorum; J. G. Droysen's essay on Demochares in Zeitschrift fur die Altertumswissenschaft (1836), Nos. 20, 21.

Notes

References
 

 

Ancient Athenians
4th-century BC Greek people
3rd-century BC Greek people
350s BC births
275 BC deaths